Salut d'Amour (lit. "Jang-soo's Mart" or "Jang-soo's Store") is a 2015 South Korean romance dramedy film starring Park Geun-hyung and Youn Yuh-jung and directed by Kang Je-gyu.

Plot
Sung-chil is a grumpy 70-year-old man who lives alone and works part-time at the local supermarket. Jang-soo, owner of the supermarket and president of the city's redevelopment project, has been trying in vain to get Sung-chil's signature (he's the last hold-out and the only reason for the project's delay), but Sung-chil stubbornly refuses any change to his lifestyle. Then he meets his new neighbor Geum-nim, a feisty yet friendly elderly lady who runs the flower shop next door. Despite his age, Sung-chil is inexperienced and clumsy at romance so the entire town cheers him on and helps him court her. But Geum-nim's daughter Min-jung disapproves of the relationship.

Cast

Park Geun-hyung as Kim Sung-chil
Jung Hae-in as young Sung-chil
Ko Yoon-ho as middle-aged Sung-chil
Youn Yuh-jung as Im Geum-nim
Yoon So-hee as young Geum-nim
Lee Moon-jung as middle-aged Geum-nim
Cho Jin-woong as Jang-soo 
Han Ji-min as Min-jung
Kim Jung-tae as Kim Chi-soo
Hwang Woo-seul-hye as Miss Park 
Lee Jun-hyeok as Ok Bok-sung
Kim Jae-hwa as Madam Wang
Moon Ga-young as Ah-young
Park Chanyeol as Min-sung
Bae Ho-geun as Jegal Chung-soo
Nam Myung-ryul as Old gentleman
Kim Ha-yoo as Da-young
Choi Kyu-hwan as Ho-joon
Lee Cho-hee as Bank clerk
Yeom Hye-ran as Milk woman
Baek Il-seob (cameo)
Im Ha-ryong (cameo)

Remake
A Chinese remake directed by Eric Tsang is in pre-production and is scheduled for release in China in 2017.

Awards and nominations

References

External links
 
 

South Korean romantic comedy films
Films directed by Kang Je-gyu
CJ Entertainment films
2010s South Korean films